Antiathonas ( or ) is a peak in the Athos peninsula. Its summit is 1042 metres above sea level.

The peak can be reached via footpaths from Dionysiou Monastery. It is located a few kilometers northwest of the summit of Mount Athos. Lakkoskiti, a Romanian skete, is located on its eastern slopes.

Gallery

References

Mount Athos
Landforms of Chalkidiki
Mountains of Central Macedonia
Mountains associated with Byzantine monasticism
Mountains associated with Christian monasticism
One-thousanders of Greece